William Ashburnham may refer to:
William Ashburnham (Royalist) (c. 1604–1679), English Member of the Long Parliament
Sir William Ashburnham, 2nd Baronet (1678–1755), British MP for Hastings 1710–1713, 1722–1741, for Seaford 1715–1717
Sir William Ashburnham, 4th Baronet (1710–1797), his nephew, Bishop of Chichester
Sir William Ashburnham, 5th Baronet (1739–1823), his son, British MP for Hastings 1761–1774
William Ashburnham, 2nd Baron Ashburnham (1679–1710), English landowner and politician